The siege of Smolensk (1613–1617) is an episode of the Polish–Muscovite War (1605–1618).

Prelude 
After the tactical victory in the Battle of Moscow (1612), the Russian government made an attempt to repulse the Poles from the strategically important fortress of Smolensk. Russian troops without a fight retook Vyazma (July 7, 1613), Dorogobuzh, and Bely, an important outpost on the Lithuanian frontier.

Siege 
Russian troops for almost four years led a protracted and unsuccessful siege of the city, which consisted mainly of blockade of the garrison. During the siege, no attempt was made to assault. In the beginning of 1617, with the onset of the offensive of Polish–Lithuanian troops on Moscow (Wladislaw III campaign), the siege was lifted.

Aftermath 
The unsuccessful siege of Smolensk predetermined the unsuccessful completion of the Polish–Muscovite War (1605–18). According to the Truce of Deulino, the Polish–Lithuanian Commonwealth retained the Smolensk lands, which were captured by Russians only in 1654 at the beginning of the next Russo-Polish War (1654-67).

References 

1620s conflicts
Smolensk 1613
Smolensk 1613
Smolensk 1613
Sieges involving the Grand Duchy of Lithuania
History of Smolensk Oblast
Smolensk